The Festival Amani is an annual festival that takes place in the context of peace building in the Democratic Republic of Congo and the Great Lakes region. Amani is the Swahili word for Peace.

Description 

The Festival Amani is held annually in Goma, a town near the border between Rwanda and the Democratic Republic of Congo. The festival hosts Music, Dancer, Comedies and other talented artists in Goma. The festival is held annually and lasts for 3 days in February of each year. The festival's name comes from the Swahili word for "peace" and it celebrates that Congolese rumba was included in the UNESCO Intangible Cultural Heritage Lists. 

In 2020, 36,000 people attended in defiance of an increase in violence in the area. The festival opened with a Congolese interpretation of Mozart's Requiem. M'bilia Bel was one of the headline performers and she include hits Mpeve ya Longo and Yamba Nga.

The festival returned in 2022 after a year's absence due to the COVID-19 pandemic in the Democratic Republic of the Congo. Bintou Keita on the United Nations was there helping to give out leaflets warning people of misinformation available on social media.

References 

Festivals established in 2013
Dance festivals in Africa
Festivals in the Democratic Republic of the Congo